Makova is a Hasidic dynasty originating in the city of Makó, Hungary, where it was founded by Rabbi Moshe Vorhand (1862–1944). It is centered in Kiryat Ata, Israel, with smaller communities in Bnei Brak, Ashdod, Elad and Boro Park, United States. The dynasty is headed by Rabbi Shimon Lemberger.

Makova dynasty 

 Moshe Vorhand (1862–1944) - Chief Rabbi of Makó (known as the "Makova Rov) and author of Ohel Moshe and Ateret Moshe, he was murdered in the Holocaust. 

 Ephraim Rosenfeld - Son-in-law of Vorhand, he was the Chief Rabbi of Szendrő, later succeeding his father-in-law as the Makova rebbe.

External links 
 

Hasidic dynasties
People from Makó